André Ravéreau (29 July 1919 – 12 October 2017) was a French architect and architectural historian known for his study and reinterpretations of vernacular Algerian architecture—particularly in M'zab and Ghardaïa.

In 1965, Ravéreau was appointed the chief architect of historic monuments in Algeria.

Ravéreau received the Aga Khan Award for Architecture for the 1978-1980 cycle for his 1976 design of the Mopti Medical Centre in Mopti, Mali.

See also 

 Hassan Fathy

References 

20th-century French architects
1919 births
People from Limoges
2017 deaths